"Theme from Close Encounters of the Third Kind" is a 1978 instrumental hit single by composer John Williams. It is the main theme of the soundtrack of the movie of the same name. The song became a hit in the United States (#13) and Canada (#12) during the winter of that year.

A few months before the release of the song, Williams had released a competing version of Star Wars theme music, "Star Wars (Main Title)," which reached number 10 on the US Billboard chart, while "Star Wars Theme/Cantina Band" was a number one hit for Meco. Both artists simultaneously again issued competing versions of scores from the Close Encounters movie. This time Williams' original score came out on top, peaking at number 13, while Meco's version reached number 25.

In 1979, "Theme from Close Encounters of the Third Kind" won a Grammy award for best instrumental composition.

Charts

Weekly charts

Year-end charts

Gene Page cover
In 1977, Gene Page recorded a disco version of "Close Encounters of the Third Kind." His version peaked on the R&B chart at #30 in 1978.

References

External links
 

1978 songs
1977 singles
Arista Records singles
Compositions by John Williams
Film theme songs
Songs about extraterrestrial life
1970s instrumentals